Jennifer Westfeldt (born February 2, 1970) is an American actress, screenwriter, director, and producer. She is best known for co-writing, co-producing, and starring in the 2002 indie film Kissing Jessica Stein, for which she received an Independent Spirit Award nomination for Best First Screenplay and a Golden Satellite Award for Best Actress - Comedy or Musical. She is also known for writing, producing, starring in, and making her directorial debut in the 2012 indie film, Friends with Kids, which was included on New York Magazine's Top Ten Movies of 2012 list, as well as NPR's Top 12 of 2012.

Westfeldt's television work includes series regular and recurring roles on Grey's Anatomy, 24, Queen America, and Notes from the Underbelly, among others, and guest-starring turns on This Is Us and Girls. She recently completed a four-season arc as Pauline Turner Brooks on TVLand's series Younger, created by Darren Star.

Westfeldt made her Broadway debut in 2003 in the revival of Wonderful Town opposite Donna Murphy, for which she received a 2004 Tony Award nomination for Best Featured Actress in a Musical, a Theater World Award for Outstanding Broadway Debut, and a Drama League Award for her role as Eileen Sherwood. Other notable stage credits include the world premieres of Nell Benjamin's The Explorers Club at Manhattan Theater Club, directed by Marc Bruni; Nicky Silver's Too Much Sun at The Vineyard Theater opposite Linda Lavin, directed by Mark Brokaw; and Scott Z. Burns' The Library at The Public Theater opposite Chloe Grace Moretz, directed by Steven Soderbergh.

Early life and education

Westfeldt is the daughter of Constance Perelson, a therapist, and Patrick M. Westfeldt Jr., an electrical engineer. Her stepfather is Michael Perelson, also a therapist. Her older sister is journalist Amy Westfeldt. Westfeldt grew up in Guilford, Connecticut, where she attended Guilford High School. She then attended Yale University, where she received a B.A. in Theater Studies. While at Yale, she starred in numerous plays and musicals and sang in the a cappella group Redhot & Blue. Her family is a part of the Swedish nobility, with the original name Wästfelt (see  Wästfelt/Westfeldt).

Career 
Upon graduating from Yale University with a B.A. in Theater Studies, Westfeldt started her career as a New York-based theater actress, starring in dozens of regional and Off-Broadway productions, including the long-running Off-Broadway musical The Fantasticks. In 1997, she was cast as a series regular on the 20th Century Fox/ABC sitcom Two Guys, a Girl and a Pizza Place, alongside Ryan Reynolds, Traylor Howard and Richard Ruccolo.

Kissing Jessica Stein 

In 1997 Westfeldt co-wrote and co-starred with Heather Juergensen in an Off-Broadway play based on a series of sketches called Lipschtick: The Story of Two Women Seeking The Perfect Shade, which caught the attention of major Hollywood studios. The play was optioned by Radar Pictures to be made into a film, but after two years of studio development, Westfeldt and Juergensen bought back the rights to the script and decided to make the film independently.

Kissing Jessica Stein debuted at the LA International Film Festival in 2001, where it won the Audience Award for Best Feature, and a Special Jury Award for Writing and Acting for Westfeldt and Juergensen. The film was released by Fox Searchlight Pictures in March 2002.

Westfeldt received the Golden Satellite Award for Best Actress in a Musical or Comedy for her role as Jessica, and an Indie Spirit Nomination for Best First Screenplay. The film won the Audience Favorites Award at the Chicago International Film Festival, the Audience Award at the Miami Film Festival, Best Feature at the Louisville Jewish Film Festival, and the GLAAD Media Award, and it was included on more than a dozen top ten lists in 2002. Variety wrote, "A fresh take on sex and the single girl, this buoyant, well-crafted romantic comedy blends pitch-perfect performances with deliciously smart writing." In Newsweek David Ansen said the film "knows what it wants, what its limits are, and delivers its delights accordingly."

In 2014, The Advocate listed the movie as an essential film for LGBTQ+ viewers that "encourages exploration and self-awareness." In 2020, Kvellar writer Mara Reinstein looked back on the impact that this "authentic" and "nuanced" movie had, writing, "I can't overstate how much Kissing Jessica Stein pioneered the gay rom-com."

Other film work 
Westfeldt's next feature, Ira & Abby, marked her first solo screenwriting effort. The film debuted at the Los Angeles Film Festival in 2006, where it won the Audience Award for Best Feature. It was acquired by Magnolia Pictures and released in the fall of 2007 to strong reviews.

Westfeldt won Best Actress at the HBO U.S. Comedy Arts Festival in Aspen in 2006 for her performance as Abby, where Ira & Abby also took home the Jury Prize for Best Feature. The film won Audience Award for Best Feature at the Boston Jewish Film Festival.

In 2011, Westfeldt wrote, produced, starred in, and made her directorial debut in Friends with Kids, which was a breakout hit at the 2011 Toronto International Film Festival. Lionsgate and Roadside Attractions obtained the rights to the film, and it was released in 2012. Westfeldt starred opposite Adam Scott, with a cast including Maya Rudolph, Kristen Wiig, Chris O'Dowd, Ed Burns, Megan Fox and Jon Hamm.

Peter Travers of Rolling Stone called Friends with Kids "an indelibly funny and touching comedy with a real sting in its tail," and deemed Westfeldt "an actress of rare wit and grace, and now a filmmaker with a keen eye for nuance. In front of the camera and behind it, she's the live current that pulls us in and makes us care. Westfeldt is the pulse of Friends With Kids, presenting us with life in all of its vibrant, messy sprawl."

The film was included on New York Magazine's Top Ten List, as well as NPR's Top 12 of 2012.

Other film roles include the 2016 short Lemon opposite Noah Bean, which premiered at the 2016 Tribeca Film Festival and, in 2017, a supporting role in director Marielle Heller’s Can You Ever Forgive Me? opposite Melissa McCarthy, which later ended up on the cutting room floor.

In 2017, Westfeldt produced the documentary Circus Kid, based on Lorenzo Pisoni's life growing up in a circus family, which was bought and distributed by Sundance Now.

Television 
After one season on Two Guys, a Girl and a Pizza Place, 20th Century Fox Studios cast Westfeldt as the lead of another series, the short-lived Holding the Baby on Fox.

She went on to star in multiple pilots, including the WB's The Gene Pool opposite Chris Eigeman; The Untitled Paul Reiser Pilot on F/X; and Steve Levitan's Dante on NBC, opposite Morris Chestnut and Kevin Hart.

In 2006, she was cast as the female lead in ABC's Notes from the Underbelly, which ran for two seasons. Andrew Johnston wrote in TimeOut: "Jennifer Westfeldt is a total babe, with physical-comedy skills that, if properly honed, could approach Lucille Ball territory. In other words, she was basically born for TV. [Westfeldt] gets to show her serious side, too, and if the series gives her enough exposure to start competing with Hope Davis and Laura Linney for blond-WASP roles, Underbelly will have more than justified its existence."

Her varied TV credits include memorable arcs on Younger, Queen America (opposite Catherine Zeta-Jones), Grey's Anatomy, 24, Judging Amy, and Hack; and guest-starring turns on NBC's hit drama This Is Us, HBO's Girls, and Childrens Hospital, among others.

She provided the voice of Kit Luntayne in the Martha Speaks episodes "Cora! Cora! Cora!" and "Cora Encore!" on PBS.

In 2022 she wrote several episodes of the Showtime series The First Lady.

Theater 
Westfeldt made her Broadway debut in the fall of 2003 in the critical and commercial hit Wonderful Town, starring opposite two-time Tony winner Donna Murphy and directed by three-time Tony winner Kathleen Marshall. Westfeldt received a 2004 Tony nomination, a Theater World Award for Outstanding Broadway Debut, and a Drama League Award for her role as Eileen Sherwood.

Of her Broadway debut, John Simon of New York magazine wrote: "Jennifer Westfeldt leaps onto the Broadway stage in full-fledged acting and singing splendor as the adorable Eileen." Ben Brantley of the New York Times wrote, "Jennifer Westfeldt makes a charming Broadway debut as Eileen, Ruth's boy-magnet of a sister." "Ms. Westfeldt's delightfully un-self-conscious interpretation suggests a virginal answer to the Vargas pinup girls," he added.

Westfeldt's other stage work includes the world premieres of Scott Z. Burns' The Library at The Public Theater opposite Chloe Grace-Moretz, directed by Steven Soderbergh; Nell Benjamin’s The Explorers Club at Manhattan Theater Club, directed by Marc Bruni; Nicky Silver's Too Much Sun at The Vineyard Theater opposite Linda Lavin, directed by Mark Brokaw; Cusi Cram's A Lifetime Burning at Primary Stages, directed by Pam MacKinnon; Joe Gilford’s Finks opposite Josh Radnor at The Powerhouse Theater/NYSAF, directed by Charlie Stratton; Stephen Belber's The Power of Duff opposite Greg Kinnear at The Powerhouse Theater/NYSAF, directed by Peter Dubois; and Alexandra Gersten-Vassilaros' Big Sky at The Geffen opposite Jon Tenney, directed by John Rando.

Development 
In 2002, Westfeldt, along with her journalist sister Amy, sold a one-hour newsroom drama pitch to Touchstone/ABC; Westfeldt was attached to star. Called The Independent, the series was loosely inspired by her sister's experiences as a career journalist at the Associated Press.

In 2010, with Alan Ball attached as executive producer, she sold a TV dramedy to HBO with her attached to star about the bird's nest custody agreement in divorce cases.

Westfeldt sold to Amazon an adapted screenplay based on the novel The Idea of You by Robinne Lee, which is set to star Anne Hathaway.

Personal life 
Westfeldt was in a long-term relationship with actor Jon Hamm from 1997 to 2015. She divides her time between New York City and Los Angeles.

Filmography

Film

Television

Theater

Awards and nominations

Further reading 

New York Magazine Interview, July 2009
Jennifer Westfeldt steps behind the camera for Friends With Kids, Backstage, February 2012
Westfeldt interview about Friends with Kids, New York Times, March 2012
Jennifer Westfeldt interview, GQ magazine, March 2012
Jennifer Westfeldt and Jon Hamm discuss baseball, Vulture, October 2012
Jennifer Westfeldt discusses fashion, More magazine, February 2013
Jennifer Westfeldt on The Library, Vanity Fair, April 2014

References

External links
 
 
 
 Interview on AOL Television

1970 births
Living people
20th-century American actresses
21st-century American actresses
Actresses from Connecticut
American film actresses
American people of Swedish descent
American stage actresses
American television actresses
California Democrats
Connecticut Democrats
American women film directors
Jewish American actresses
Jewish American writers
New York (state) Democrats
People from Guilford, Connecticut
American women screenwriters
Yale University alumni
Film directors from Connecticut
Screenwriters from Connecticut
American women film producers
Film producers from Connecticut
People from the Upper West Side
Theatre World Award winners
21st-century American Jews